Rafael Pucić (27 April 1828 – 4 November 1890) was a lawyer and politician from Dubrovnik. He was a member of the Austrian Imperial Council and served as mayor of Dubrovnik.

References

1828 births
1890 deaths
Croatian politicians
Mayors of Dubrovnik